Lycidocerus fallax is a species of beetle in the family Cerambycidae, the only species in the genus Lycidocerus.

References

Lepturinae